Athous dasycerus is a species of click beetle of the family Elateridae.

References

Beetles described in 1890
Dendrometrinae